This partial list of city nicknames in California compiles the aliases, sobriquets, mottos and slogans that cities in California are known by (or have been known by historically), officially and unofficially, to locals, outsiders or their tourism boards or chambers of commerce. City nicknames can help in establishing a civic identity, helping outsiders recognize a community or attracting people to a community because of its nickname; promote civic pride; and build community unity. Nicknames and slogans that successfully create a new community "ideology or myth" are also believed to have economic value. Their economic value is difficult to measure, but there are anecdotal reports of cities that have achieved substantial economic benefits by "branding" themselves by adopting new slogans.

Some unofficial nicknames are positive, while others are derisive. The unofficial nicknames listed here have been in use for a long time or have gained wide currency.

Nicknames by city

A
Alameda – The Island City
Antioch – Gateway to the Delta
Arcadia – Community of Homes
Azusa -  "Everything from A to Z in the U.S.A."
Auburn – Endurance Capital of The World
Anaheim - Ducktown (after The Anaheim Ducks).

B

Bakersfield
California's Country Music Capital
 Nashville West
Berkeley
Berzerkeley
The People's Republic of Berkeley
Athens of the West
Bishop – Mule Packer Capital of the World
Blythe – Friendliest City In The West
Buena Park – Center of the Southland
Burbank  – Media Capital of the World

C

Campbell – The Orchard City
Carlsbad – Village by the sea
Castroville – Artichoke Center of the WorldMotto ought to be boffo, Irvine World News, February 22, 2004.
Chatsworth – San Pornando
Chico
 City of Roses
 City of Trees
 Almond Capital of the World
 Where Everything Grows
Clovis – Gateway to the Sierra
Coachella
City of Eternal Sunshine
Gateway to the Salton Sea
Colma (founded as a necropolis in 1924)
 The City of the Silent
Compton – The Hub City
Corning – Olive City
Corona – The Circle City
Coronado – The Crown City
Corte Madera – The Twin City (with Larkspur)
Costa Mesa
 Costa Mexico
Culver City – Heart of Screenland

D

Daly City
Gateway To The Peninsula
Little Manila
Davis 
 Bicycle Capital of the World.OpenWorld.gov
 People's Republic of Davis
Del Mar – Where the turf meets the surf
Dinuba – Raisinland, USA

F
Fallbrook – Avocado Capital of the World
Raisin Capital of the World
City of Youth and Ambition
Forestville – Poison Oak Capital of the World
Fountain Valley – "A nice place to live"

G

 Garden Grove
 Big Strawberry
 Garbage Grove
Gilroy – Garlic Capital of the WorldGreetings From America's Secret Capitals, Time (magazine), July 13, 1998.
 Glendale – The Jewel City
 Glendora – The Pride of the Foothills
 Goleta – The Good Land
 Greenfield – Broccoli Capital of the World
 Gridley – Kiwi Fruit Capital of the World

H
 Half Moon Bay – Pumpkin Capital
 Hawthorne – City of Good Neighbors
 Hayward
Heart of the Bay 
The Haystack
 Hercules – The Dynamic City on the Bay
 Holtville – The Carrot Capital of the World
 Huntington Beach – Surf City, USA
 Scumington Beach

I
 Indio 
City of Festivals
Date Capital of the World
 Inglewood – The City of Champions
 Isleton – Asparagus Capital of the World

L
 La Crescenta-Montrose – The Balcony of Southern California
 La Habra - Guadalahabra
 La Mesa – 
 Jewel of the Hills
 Larkspur – The Twin City (with Corte Madera)
 Linden – Cherry Capital of the World
Livingston - Sweet Potato Capitol of the World
 Lodi
 Tokay Grape Capital of the World
 Zinfandel Capital of the World
 Lompoc – Flower Seed Capital of the World
 Long Beach
 The International City
 Iowa by the Sea (historical nickname)
 Los Angeles
 L.A.
 The Angels (literal Spanish translation)
 Angeltown
 The Big Orange
 City of AngelsQueen City, Time (magazine), January 30, 1928, accessed April 13, 1928. – based partially on the literal translation of the city's original historical full name from the Spanish language -- "The City of Our Lady the Queen of the Angels".
 City of Flowers and Sunshine
 La-La Land
 Shaky Town
 Tinseltown (specifically applies to Hollywood)
City of Champions (used in 2020 after the Lakers and Dodgers championships just 16 days apart) 
Tehrangeles or little Persia

M
Manteca - Lard City
 Marysville – Gateway to the Gold Fields
McCloud – Blackberry Capital of the World
Mendota - Cantaloupe Center of the World
Merced – Gateway to Yosemite
Milpitas – Crossroads of Silicon Valley
Modesto – Water, Wealth, Contentment, Health
Monterey – The Cradle of History

N
 Needles – Weedles
 Norco – Horse Town USA
 Norwalk – The Keystone City

O
 Oakdale – Cowboy Capital of the World
 Oakland
Bright Side of the Bay
Athens of the Pacific (historical) 
Detroit of the West (historical)
 Oaktown
O-Town
The Town
Bump City (historical)
Ojai – Shangri La 
Oxnard
Lima Bean Capital of the World
Strawberry Capital of the World

P

Pacific Grove
America's Last Hometown
Butterfly Town, U.S.A.
Pacifica – Fog Capital of California
Palm Springs – Golf Capital of the World
Pasadena
City of Roses
Crown City
Paso Robles
The Pass of the Oaks
Pearsonville – Hubcap Capital of the World
Placerville – Old Hangtown
Poway – The City In The Country

R
Redwood City
 Climate Best By Government Test
 Deadwood City
Reedley – The World's Fruit Basket
Richmond – City of Pride and Purpose
Ripon – City of Almonds
Riverside
City of Arts and Innovation
City of Trees

S
 Sacramento
Almond Capital of the World

Big Tomato
Camellia City
City of Trees
River CitySacramento Earns High Marks as 'Green' Leader , article from Sacramento Business Journal, July 2, 2007. "The River City joined Minneapolis and Tallahassee, Fla., as ... runners-up."
Sacratomato
Sactown
Salinas 
 Lettuce Capital of the World
 The Salad Bowl of the World
San Carlos – City of Good Living
San Diego
America's Finest CityLeo, Peter. "'America's finest city' takes a fall", Pittsburgh Post-Gazette, December 6, 2005, accessed April 12, 2007. "Which brings us to less-humble San Diego. It had the nerve to tout itself as "America's Finest City."... This would seem to present an opportunity for Tampa, which bills itself as "America's Next Greatest City."
City in Motion
 San Francisco
 Baghdad by the Bay
 The Paris of the West
 The City
 The City by the Bay
 The City That Knows How (archaic)
 Everybody's Favorite City
 Fog City
 Frisco (locally disparaged)Many tourists refer to San Francisco as "Frisco", a name popularized through songs like (Sittin' on) the Dock of the Bay and Sweet Little Sixteen. However, locals discourage this use and prefer the nickname The City by the Bay. Samuel D. Cohen writes that many credit "Friscophobia" to newspaper columnist Herb Caen, whose first book, published in 1953, was "Don't Call it Frisco." Caen was considered by many to be the recognized authority on what was, and what was not, beneath the city's dignity, and to him, Frisco was intolerable. 
 The Exposition City (archaic)
 The Ideal Convention City (archaic)
 The Golden Gate City
 San Fran (locally disparaged)
San Jose 
Man Jose
The Capital of Silicon Valley
San Jo (pronounced SAN HO) 
Teal Town 
Fin City
Tan Jose
The Garden City 
Richest City in the USA
San Leandro – The 'Dro
San Luis Obispo
S.L.O. (as in, Experience the SLO Life)
Happiest City in America
San Pablo – City of New Directions
San Quentin – Bastille by the Bay
Sanger – Christmas Tree City
Santa Barbara – The American Riviera
Santa Catalina Island – The Island of Romance
Santa Cruz – (The real) Surf City, USA
Santa Monica
Dogtown
Home of the Homeless
People's Republic of Santa Monica
Soviet Monica
Santa Paula – Citrus Capital of the World
Selma – Raisin Capital of the World
Smith River – Lily Growing Capital of the World

Solvang – Danish capital of America.
South San Francisco – The Industrial City, South City
Stockton 
Asparagus Capital of the World
Tuleburg
Gas City
Mudville
Sunnyvale – The Heart of Silicon Valley

T
Tulelake – Horseradish Capital of the World

V
 Vacaville – Cowtown
Valencia – Awesometown
Vallejo – Valley Joe
 Ventura – Poinsettia City (formerly Palm City)
Visalia – Gateway to the Sequoias

W
Wasco – Rose Growing Capital of the World
Watsonville – Strawberry Capital of the World.
Willits
 Gateway to the Redwoods
 Heart of Mendocino County
 Solar Energy Capital of the World
Willow Creek – Bigfoot Capital of the World

Y
Yorba Linda – Land of Gracious Living
Yuba City – Prune Capital

See also
List of city nicknames in the United States
List of cities in California

References

External links
a list of American and a few Canadian nicknames
U.S. cities list

City nicknames in California
California